

Road bridges

Proposed

Rail bridges

Proposed